The Tifton Phillies were a Georgia–Florida League baseball team based in Tifton, Georgia, USA that played during the 1956 season. They were affiliated with the Philadelphia Phillies. They were managed by Wes Griffin and later Edward Miller.

However the team was first established in 1949 as the Tifton Blue Sox and was a member of the Georgia State League. The team moved to the Georgia–Florida League in 1951. In 1954, the team was known as the Tifton Indians, after their major league affiliate, the Cleveland Indians.

References 

Baseball teams established in 1949
Defunct minor league baseball teams
Cleveland Guardians minor league affiliates
Philadelphia Phillies minor league affiliates
1949 establishments in Georgia (U.S. state)
1956 disestablishments in Georgia (U.S. state)
Baseball teams disestablished in 1956
Defunct baseball teams in Georgia
Defunct Georgia State League teams